Berivan İçen (born 15 July 2003) is a Turkish footballer from Turkey, who plays for the Turkish Women's First League team Beşiktaş as a midfielder. She was a member of the Turkey women's national under-17 football team and now represents the Turkish women's national team.

Early life 
Berivan İçen was born in Mazıdağı district of Mardin Province, southeastern Turkey, on 15 July 2003. She has nine siblings.

Club career 
İçen began playing football at age six in 2010. She was discovered as she drew the attention of the chairman of amateur club Cennet Barbarosspor's in Küçükçekmece, district of Istanbul Province. She was playing with the football on the touchline. The club chairman convinced her father to let her join by promising to finance the girl's education expenses. In 2012, she entered the team of her age group, which consisted of boys only. That year, the left-footed girl was instrumental for her team's advance to the quarter-finals at a tournament organized by the Municipality of Küçükçekmece in the National Sovereignty and Children's Day.

İçen obtained her license to play for Galatasaray on 17 April 2015. She scored eleven goals in a match of the 7th round in the 2016 Girls' under-13 League (Minik Kızlar Ligi) that ended 15–0 for her team Galatasaray. In October 2016, after Galatasaray closed the women's football department, she transferred to Beşiktaş In the 2018–19 season, she joined Akdeniz Nurçelik Spor in Küçükçekmece to play in the Women's Second League. She scored 15 goals in 14 matches. In the 2020–21 season, she returned to her former club Beşiktaş, where she scored two goals in nine games. Following her team's champion title in the 2020–21 Turkcell League season, she played in two matches of the 2021–22 UEFA Women's Champions League qualifying rounds.

International career 
İçen was called up to the Turkey women's national under-17 football team, and debuted in the friendly match against Russia on 21 December 2017. She played in two of the 2018 UEFA Women's under-17 Championship qualification matches. She took part in three 2018 UEFA Women's Under-16 Development Tournament matches. Further, she played in three 2020 UEFA Women's under-17 Championship qualification matches. She has been capped 25 times by the Turkey women's under-17 team, and scored 12 goals in total.

In September 2020, she was called up to the Turkey women's national team. She debuted at the UEFA Women's Euro 2021 qualifying match against Slovenia on 18 September 2020.

Career statistics 
.

Honours
 Turkish Women's First League
 Beşiktaş J.K.
 Winners (1): 2020–21 
 Runners-up (1): 2019–20 1

References

External links 

2003 births
Living people
People from Mardin Province
Turkey women's international footballers
Turkish women's footballers
Women's association football midfielders
Turkish Kurdish people
Kurdish sportspeople
Galatasaray S.K. women's football players
Akdeniz Nurçelik Spor players
Beşiktaş J.K. women's football players
Turkish Women's Football Super League players
21st-century Turkish sportswomen